Giderli 16 (Break Up 16) is the seventh studio album by Turkish singer Demet Akalın. It was released on 19 November 2012 by Seyhan Müzik.

Background and promotion
For this album, Akalın worked with a number of different artists, including Sinan Akçıl, Ersay Üner, Gökhan Şahin, Emrah Karaduman, Altan Çetin, Gökhan Özen, Ayla Çelik, Gökhan Tepe, Ceyhun Çelikten, Hakan Tunçbilek, Emirkan, Özcan Deniz, Günay Çoban, Niran Ünsal, Murat Güneş, Cansu Kurtçu, Deniz Erten, Erhan Bayrak, and Suat Aydoğan. To promote the album, Akalın began a tour of concerts, starting at locations such as the Zincirlikuyu Airport.

Achievements and critical reception
By early December, the album became the best-selling album of the month. It eventually sold 69,000 copies in Turkey, becoming the ninth best-selling album of the year. In January 2013, TTNET Müzik named her the national artist with the most number of streams in the country. The critics stated that Akalın had continued to repeat the style of her previous works in this album and that she was making commercial-like music to sell out the album. Ersay Üner was featured on the lead single "Yılan". The song "Türkan", which was written as a tribute to Türkan Şoray, was chosen as the Best Song at the Turkey Music Awards and the 40th Golden Butterfly Awards. After these two songs, new music videos for "Giderli Şarkılar", "Yıkıl Karşımdan" (feat. Gökhan Özen), "Kalbindeki İmza", "Sepet", "Nasip Değilmiş" (duet with Özcan Deniz) and "Felaket" were released.

Track listing

Personnel 
 Supervisor: Demet Akalın
 Producer: Bülent Seyhan, Fuat Seyhan 
 Music Director: Erhan Bayrak
 Coordinator: Seyfi Yerlikaya
 Hair: Erkan Kurtses
 Outfits: Gazzas Grafik, Savaş Avcı, Özlem Kaya
 Mastering: Levent Demirbaş
 Photographs: Müjdat Küpşi
 Styling: Bener Hamamcı
 Graphic Design: Özlem Semiz
 Printing: FRS
 Studios: Seyhan Müzik

Sales

References 

2012 albums
Demet Akalın albums